Zihni is a Turkish given name for males. People named Zihni include:

 Zihni Derin (1880–1965), Turkish agronomist
 Zihni Abaz Kanina (1885–1959), Albanian diplomat
 Mustafa Zihni Pasha (1838–1929), Ottoman official 

Turkish masculine given names